Lakshmi Rave Maa Intiki is a 2014 romantic drama film directed by Nandyala Ravi. The film stars Naga Shaurya and Avika Gor in the lead roles with Rao Ramesh in a pivotal role.

Cast 
Naga Shaurya as Sai Prasad
Avika Gor as Lakshmi
Rao Ramesh as Sarvesh Anand Rao, a town planner and Lakshmi's father
Naresh as Sai's father
Pavitra Lokesh as Anand Rao’s lover
Saptagiri as Sai's assistant and friend
Pragathi as Sai's mother
Satyam Rajesh
Vennela Kishore as Software Subramanyam

Production 
As of May 2014, most of the shoot had been completed. The songs were shot in Coorg and Puducherry. In addition to Shaurya and Gor, Rao Ramesh, Naresh, Sapthagiri and Satyam Rajesh were revealed to be part of the film.

Soundtrack 
Soundtrack was composed by K. M. Radhakrishna.
"Devatalle" - K. M. Radhakrishnan
"Katuka Diddina" - Hemachandran
"Aa Venneladaina" - Karthik, Sunitha
"Entha Sogasu" - Gayatri Narayan
"Raave Maa" - Deepu
"Manasulo" - Srikrishna
"Amma Kadupu" - Sridevi
"Venu Gaana" - Sunitha

Release 
The Times of India gave this film two out of five stars and wrote that "There are films which bore you to death and then, there are films which aim too high and fall flat, but this one makes you wonder if the actors and the director, were as clueless as the audience is". The Hindu stated that "The convoluted screenplay will make you look towards the exit door".

References

External links 

2014 films
2010s Telugu-language films
2014 romantic drama films
Films shot in Puducherry
Films shot in Karnataka
Indian romantic drama films
Films scored by K. M. Radha Krishnan